Jermine Detrez Newsome (born March 6, 1994) is an American football running back for the Ottawa Redblacks of the Canadian Football League (CFL). He played college football at Western Carolina and signed with the Los Angeles Chargers as an undrafted free agent in 2018.

Early years
Newsome attended and played high school football at Hoke County High School.

College career
Newsome attended and played college football at Western Carolina. Against South Carolina in the 2016 season, he had a 39-yard rushing touchdown and a 93-yard kickoff return for a touchdown.

Professional career

Los Angeles Chargers
Newsome was signed by the Los Angeles Chargers as an undrafted free agent following the 2018 NFL Draft. He played in the first three games of the season and recorded a single rushing attempt after making the Chargers 53-man roster, but was waived on September 24, 2018, and re-signed to the practice squad. He was promoted back to the active roster on October 20, 2018. He appeared in nine games and had 11 carries for 49 rushing yards.

On August 31, 2019, Newsome was waived by the Chargers and signed to the practice squad the next day. He was placed on the practice squad/injured list on October 15, 2019, and was released with an injury settlement the next day.

Ottawa Redblacks
Newsome signed with the Ottawa Redblacks of the CFL on December 14, 2020.

References

External links
Los Angeles Chargers bio
Western Carolina Catamounts bio

1994 births
Living people
People from Raeford, North Carolina
Players of American football from North Carolina
American football running backs
Western Carolina Catamounts football players
Los Angeles Chargers players
Ottawa Redblacks players